Roberts Road station, formerly Rosemont station, is a SEPTA rapid transit station in Rosemont, Pennsylvania. It serves the Norristown High Speed Line (Route 100) and is located at Roberts Road and David Drive in Radnor Township, Pennsylvania. Local, Hughes Park Express, and Norristown Express trains stop at Roberts Road.

Station layout

History

The Rosemont station of the Philadelphia and Western Railroad opened in 1907.

The station was renamed from Rosemont to Roberts Road by SEPTA on September 5, 2010.

References

External links

 Roberts Road entrance from Google Maps Street View

SEPTA Norristown High Speed Line stations
Radnor Township, Delaware County, Pennsylvania
Railway stations in the United States opened in 1907